Willy Schwedler (4 August 1894 – 26 March 1945) was a German international footballer.

References

1894 births
1945 deaths
Association football goalkeepers
German footballers
Germany international footballers